MHK can refer to:

 Manhattan Regional Airport, Kansas, USA, IATA code
 Member of the House of Keys, the Lower House of Tynwald, the Isle of Man Parliament